Elli Stai (born in Athens to parents from Lefkada 21 March 1954) is a Greek journalist and talk show presenter on Greek TV.

Education
She graduated from School of Law, Economics and Political Sciences of the University of Athens. 
She also studied Political Sciences in France. For a small period of time she worked as a lawyer.

Career

She started her career as a journalist at the Greek newspapers [Mesimvrini] and [Acropolis], where she had her first front page with the interview of Gianni Agnelli. Her television career started from ERT (Greek Public Television), in the early 1980s. In 1989 she worked for Flash 96 radiostation, as a reporter of European matters in Brussels.

In 1993 she returned to Greece as an anchorwoman at the News Bulletin for SKAI television. In 1996 she presented the talk show Ellispontos at MEGA CHANNEL.

From 1997 until 2006 she worked for STAR TV, where she presented the News Bulletin. From 1999 until 2006 she presented the talk show Me ta matia tis Ellis, and later she was the anchorwoman of the news bulletin of ANT1 TV.

In 2007, she returned to Mega Channel TV, as the anchorwoman of the talk show Elli, as well as a commentator for the news Bulletin. In January 2008, Elli Stai became the anchorwoman of ALPHA TV, for the News Bulletin. In 2009 she returned to Flash 96 radiostation with the radio show Ellispoint at Flash96.

In February 2011 she returned to Public TV [ERT] as an anchorwoman for the News Bulletin, as well as presenting the weekly talk show NETWEEK. ERT1.

References

External links
 

1954 births
Greek television journalists
Living people
Journalists from Athens